Aerides inflexa is a species of orchid in the genus Aerides that was first described in 1862. It is native to Borneo and  Sulawesi.

References

inflexa
Plants described in 1862
Orchids of Borneo
Flora of Sulawesi